Amydria clemensella is a moth of the family Acrolophidae. It is found in North America.

References

Moths described in 1874
Acrolophidae